Kappur may refer to:

 Kappur, a village and gram panchayat in Villupuram district, state of Tamil Nadu, India
 Kappur (Palakkad district), a village and gram panchayat in Palakkad district, state of Kerala, India